"Now That We're Dead" is a song by American heavy metal band Metallica and the fourth single from their tenth studio album, Hardwired... to Self-Destruct. The song was released as a single five months after the album's release, on April 18, 2017. The song made its live debut at Gocheok Sky Dome in Seoul on January 11, 2017, and was later played during The Late Show with Stephen Colbert on May 15, 2017.

Music videos 

The first music video of the song was released on November 16, 2016, and was directed by Herring & Herring and edited by Jeremiah Bruckart. The second music video was released on May 31, 2017, and was filmed in Mexico City by Brett Murray.

In other media 
The song was used as the entrance theme for WWE wrestler The Undertaker during the first night of WrestleMania 36 prior to his Boneyard Match against AJ Styles. The match was also The Undertaker’s final match of his career, as he would then announce his retirement from in-ring competition at Survivor Series later in the year, which coincided with the 30th anniversary of his debut with the company. The song was also used in a video package celebrating his career which aired during the event.

In July 2020, WWE chairwoman Stephanie McMahon revealed that Metallica was originally scheduled to perform the song live at WrestleMania 36, which was to be held at Raymond James Stadium in Tampa, Florida, had the COVID-19 pandemic not forced WWE to hold the show behind closed doors. Raymond James Stadium hosted WrestleMania 37 the following year instead. Metallica did not make an appearance at WrestleMania 37.

Personnel 

James Hetfield – vocals, rhythm and lead guitar
Kirk Hammett – lead guitar
Robert Trujillo – bass
Lars Ulrich – drums

Charts

References 

2016 songs
2017 singles
Metallica songs
Songs written by James Hetfield
Songs written by Lars Ulrich